The 2010–11 season will be the 50th season of competitive association football in Algeria.

Promotion and relegation

Pre-season

National teams

Algeria national football team

2010 FIFA World Cup

2012 Africa Cup of Nations qualification

International Friendlies

2010 Africa Cup of Nations

Quarter-finals

Semi-finals

Third-place play-off

Algerian women's national football team

League season

Ligue Professionnelle 1

Ligue Professionnelle 2

Ligue Nationale du Football Amateur

Groupe Centre-Est

Groupe Centre-Ouest

Inter-Régions Division

Groupe Ouest

Groupe Centre Est

Groupe Centre Ouest

Groupe Est

Ligue Régional I

Ligue Régionale Ouargla

Women's football

Diary of the season

Deaths

Retirements

Notes

References